Whipplea is a monotypic genus containing the single species Whipplea modesta, which is known by several common names including common whipplea, yerba de selva, and modesty. It is a dicot shrub or sub-shrub in the Hydrangeaceae family, native to the Pacific Coastal region of the United States.

Whipplea appears to have been first recorded in 1853 by the Scottish botanical explorer John Jeffrey in the Umpqua Valley near Mount Shasta, California, and named for Lieutenant Amiel Weeks Whipple (1817–1863), American surveyor and engineer.

References 

 Harvey, A. G., "John Jeffrey: Botanical Explorer", in The Siskiyou Pioneer in Folklore, Fact and Fiction and Yearbook, Siskiyou County Historical Society. 1947. pp. 17–19, 39.

External links

Jepson Manual Treatment
Calflora

Hydrangeaceae
Monotypic asterid genera
Flora of the United States
Cornales genera